This is a list of ski areas and resorts in Africa.

Despite the general perception that Africa is too warm for snow, there are several ski areas that exist across the continent.

Algeria
Chréa
Tikjda

Lesotho
Afriski

Morocco
Ifrane
Mischliffen
Oukaimeden

South Africa
Tiffindell

Africa
Skiing in Africa
Ski
Ski